The National Federation of Fishermen's Organisations (NFFO) is a main British trade organisation representing British fishermen, in relation to European fishing regulations.

History
It was founded in 1977, in relation to new European regulations which were enacted in 1983.

The organisation was incorporated in June 2008.

Structure
It is headquartered in central York.

Training
A division of the organisation provides training for British fishermen.

See also
 European Fisheries Alliance (set up in 2017 to represent EU fishermen)
 Federation of Irish Fishermen
 Fishing industry in England
 Fishing industry in Scotland

References

External links
 NFFO

1977 establishments in the United Kingdom
Fishing in the United Kingdom
Fishing trade associations
Food industry trade groups based in the United Kingdom
Organisations based in York
Organizations established in 1977